Francia Raisa Almendarez (born July 26, 1988) is an American actress. Raisa is known for her roles in Bring It On: All or Nothing, The Secret Life of the American Teenager, Grown-ish, and How I Met Your Father.

Early life and education
Raisa was born in Los Angeles, California to a Mexican mother, Virginia Almendárez (née Pelayo), and Renán Almendárez Coello, a Honduran-born radio personality; and raised in Los Angeles.  A few years after she was born, her father started using his new Latin radio personality, "El Cucuy".

Raisa attended Bishop Alemany High School in Mission Hills, California, where she was a cheerleader.

Career
Raisa began to take acting jobs in her junior year of high school, modeling for print ads and appearing in commercials. She guest-starred in the sitcoms American Family: Journey of Dreams and Over There. Raisa appeared in Lil' Romeo's music video "My Girlfriend" as Tamy in 2004 and in Iyaz's music video "So Big". A month into her senior year, she booked one of her first lead roles, starring opposite Hayden Panettiere in Bring It On: All or Nothing.  She co-starred in the Nickelodeon movie Shredderman Rules, where she portrayed Isabel, and in The Cutting Edge: Chasing the Dream and The Cutting Edge: Fire and Ice as Alexandra Delgado. She played the role of Adrian Lee in the hit ABC Family drama, The Secret Life of the American Teenager, from its beginning in July 2008, until the series finale in early June 2013.

In 2009, Raisa guest-starred on the USA Network's TV series In Plain Sight and co-starred in a short film directed by David Henrie called Boo, which aired on YouTube. In 2013, Raisa starred in the Christmas-themed movie Christmas Bounty alongside Mike "The Miz" Mizanin.

From 2018 to 2022, Raisa starred in the Freeform show, Grown-ish, executive produced by Black-ish creator Kenya Barris. She starred in the show's first four seasons, exiting upon the character's graduation at the end of the fourth season. She also starred in Freeform's 2018 television film, Life-Size 2, opposite Tyra Banks.

In May 2021, Raisa was cast in How I Met Your Mother'''s spinoff series How I Met Your Father'', which premiered on Hulu on January 18, 2022. In February 2022, the series was renewed for a 20-episode second season.

Personal life
Raisa was born in Los Angeles. In the summer of 2017, Raisa donated one of her kidneys to her friend, singer and actress Selena Gomez, who has lupus.

Filmography

Film

Television

Music videos

Awards and nominations

References

External links

 
 

1988 births
21st-century American actresses
American actresses of Mexican descent
American people of Honduran descent
American film actresses
Actresses from Los Angeles
American television actresses
Living people
Organ transplant donors
Hispanic and Latino American actresses